Richard James Horatio Gottheil (13 October 1862 – 22 May 1936) was an English American Semitic scholar, Zionist, and founding father of Zeta Beta Tau fraternity.

Biography
He was born in Manchester, England, but moved to the United States at age 11 when his father, Gustav Gottheil, accepted a position as the assistant Rabbi of the largest Reform synagogue in New York, Temple Emanu-El. He graduated from Columbia College in 1881, and studied also in Europe, earning his doctorate at the University of Leipzig in 1886.

From 1898 to 1904 he was president of the American Federation of Zionists, and worked with both Stephen S. Wise and Jacob De Haas as organizational secretaries. Though he was ever desirous of returning to the quiet life of academia, Gottheil attended the Second Zionist Congress in Basel, establishing relationships with Theodor Herzl and Max Nordau. "Professor Gottheil shunned publicity; he did not mind the trickles of adulation accorded him as President; but his official duties irked him beyond endurance. He hated to preside at meetings. He was careless in procedural matters and embarrassed by ceremonies in which he had to take part. He was horrified by emotional debates. He felt that his status as a professor was being sullied by his being President of a propaganda organization. He ran away from official duties. He usually limited his official addresses at Zionist meetings to the necessary items, speaking briefly. He became more and more nerve-provoked by his status, especially as the practical affairs of the Zionist Federation made no visible progress." Gottheil virtually vanished from the Zionist movement for the rest of his life. He continued writing and supporting the Zionist effort, but he never again undertook a leadership role.

After 1904 he was vice president of the American Jewish Historical Society. Gottheil wrote many articles on Oriental and Jewish questions for newspapers and reviews. He edited the Columbia University Oriental Series, and the Semitic Study Series. After 1901 he was one of the editors of the Jewish Encyclopedia. He wrote the chapter on Zionism which was translated into Arabic and published by Najib Nassar in his newspaper Al-Karmil and also in the form of a book in 1911.

He died on 22 May 1936.

Publications
 The Syriac grammar of Mar Elia Zobha (1887)
 Selections from the Syriac Julian Romance (1906)
 Zionism (1914)

References

External links

 
 
 
 Gottheil profile on ZBT.org

1862 births
1936 deaths
19th-century American male writers
19th-century English male writers
20th-century American male writers
20th-century English male writers
American Hebraists
American male non-fiction writers
American political writers
American Reform Jews
American Zionists
British Hebraists
British Jews
British Reform Jews
British Zionists
Burials at Salem Fields Cemetery
College fraternity founders
Columbia College (New York) alumni
Contributors to the Jewish Encyclopedia
English emigrants to the United States
English Jewish writers
English male non-fiction writers
English orientalists
English political writers
Jewish American writers
Leipzig University alumni
New York Public Library people
Semiticists
Writers from Manchester
Zeta Beta Tau
Reform Zionists